Bohle is a northern suburb in the City of Townsville, Queensland, Australia.

Geography 
The southern half of the suburb is predominaly occupied by the Bohle Industrial Estate. There is a small residential area around Clay Street and a caravan park in Ingham Road.

The northern half of the suburb is a restricted area occupied by the Bohle Transmitter Station, an Australian Defence Force facility occupying  with a transmission mast which forms part of the Modernised High Frequency Communications System.

History 
Bohle is situated in the traditional Wulgurukaba Aboriginal country.
The suburb takes its name from the Bohle River, which was named after Henry Mackinnon Bohle (1842–1923), a pioneer who brought cattle to the district in 1863. On 1 September 1967 the district was first named by the Queensland Place Names Board, becoming a suburb on 12 June 1992.

Bohlevale State School  opened on 20 November 1911. As at 2020, it is within the neighbouring suburb of Burdell.

Education 
There are no schools in Bohle. The nearest primary schools are in neighbouring Burdell offering a choice of government school  (Bohlevale State School) and Catholic school (St Clare's) and independent school Townsville Grammar School's North Shore campus. The nearest government secondary school is North Shores State High School in Deeragun. Calvary Christian College is an independent school in neighbouring Mount Louisa offering both primary and secondary education. Townville Grammar School offers secondary education but only on its North Ward campus.

References 

Suburbs of Townsville